The Faroe Islands, or simply the Faroes, are a North Atlantic island group and an autonomous territory of the Kingdom of Denmark.

The islands form part of the Kingdom of Denmark, along with mainland Denmark and Greenland.

The terrain is rugged, and the subpolar oceanic climate (Cfc) is windy, wet, cloudy, and cool. The northerly latitude also results in perpetual civil twilight during summer nights and very short winter days.

Between 1035 and 1814, the Faroe Islands were part of the Kingdom of Norway, which was in a personal union with Denmark from 1380. In 1814, the Treaty of Kiel transferred Norway to Sweden, whereas Denmark kept its Atlantic territories, which included the Faroe Islands, Greenland and Iceland.

While part of the Kingdom of Denmark, the Faroe Islands have been self-governing since 1948, controlling most areas apart from military defence, policing, justice, currency, and foreign affairs. Because the Faroe Islands are not part of the same customs area as Denmark, the Faroe Islands have an independent trade policy, and can establish trade agreements with other states. The Faroes have an extensive bilateral free trade agreement with Iceland, known as the Hoyvík Agreement. In the Nordic Council, they are represented as part of the Danish delegation. In certain sports, the Faroe Islands field their own national teams. They did not become a part of the European Economic Community in 1973, instead keeping the autonomy over their own fishing waters.

Etymology
The first element, may reflect an Old Norse word  ('sheep'), although this analysis is sometimes disputed because Faroese now uses the word  (from Old Norse ) to mean 'sheep'. Another possibility is that the Irish monks, who settled the island around 625, had already given the islands a name related to the Gaelic word , meaning 'land' or 'estate'. This name could then have been passed on to the Norwegian settlers, who then added  (islands). The name thus translates as either 'Islands of Sheep' or 'Land Islands'.

In English, it may be seen as a tautology to say the Faroe Islands, since the oe comes from an element meaning 'island'. This is seen in the BBC Shipping Forecast, where the waters around the islands are called Faeroes. The name is also rarely spelled Faeroe.

History

There is some evidence of settlement on the Faroe Islands before Norse Viking settlers arrived in the ninth century AD. Archeologists found burnt grains of domesticated barley and peat ash deposited in two phases; the first dated between the mid-fourth and mid-sixth centuries, and another between the late-sixth and late-eighth centuries. Researchers have also found sheep DNA in lake-bed sediments, which were dated to around the year 500. Barley and sheep had to have been brought to the islands by humans. As Scandinavians did not begin using the sail until about 750, it is unlikely they could have reached the Faroes before then, and it is more likely the settlers came from Great Britain or Ireland.

Archaeologist Mike Church noted that Dicuil, an Irish monk of the early ninth century, may have mentioned the Faroes. Dicuil wrote in his geographical work De mensura orbis terrae that there were heremitae ex nostra Scotia ("hermits from our land of Ireland/Scotland") who had lived on the northerly islands of Britain for almost a hundred years until the Vikings arrived. Church suggested that the people living there might have been from Ireland, Scotland, or Scandinavia, or possibly from all three. According to a ninth-century voyage tale, the Irish saint Brendan visited islands resembling the Faroes in the sixth century. This association, however, is not conclusive.

Norsemen settled the islands c. 800, bringing Old West Norse, which evolved into the modern Faroese language. According to Icelandic sagas such as Færeyjar Saga, one of the best known men in the island was Tróndur í Gøtu, a descendant of Scandinavian chiefs who had settled in Dublin, Ireland. Tróndur led the battle against Sigmund Brestisson, the Norwegian monarchy and the Norwegian church.

The Norse and Norse–Gael settlers probably did not come directly from Scandinavia, but rather from Norse communities surrounding the Irish Sea, Northern Isles, and Outer Hebrides of Scotland, including the Shetland and Orkney islands. A traditional name for the islands in Irish, Na Scigirí, possibly refers to the (Eyja-)Skeggjar "(Island-)Beards", a nickname given to island dwellers.

According to the Færeyinga saga, more emigrants left Norway who did not approve of the monarchy of Harald Fairhair (ruled c. 872 to 930). These people settled the Faroes around the end of the ninth century. Early in the eleventh century, Sigmundur Brestisson (961–1005) – whose clan had flourished in the southern islands before invaders from the northern islands almost exterminated it – escaped to Norway. He was sent back to take possession of the islands for Olaf Tryggvason, King of Norway from 995 to 1000. Sigmundur introduced Christianity, forcing Tróndur í Gøtu to convert or face beheading and, although Sigmundur was subsequently murdered, Norwegian taxation was upheld. Norwegian control of the Faroes continued until 1814, although, when the Kingdom of Norway (872–1397) entered the Kalmar Union with Denmark, this gradually resulted in Danish control of the islands. The Protestant Reformation in the form of Lutheranism reached the Faroes in 1538. When the union between Denmark and Norway was dissolved as a result of the Treaty of Kiel in 1814, Denmark retained possession of the Faroe Islands (along with Greenland and Iceland); Norway itself was joined in a union with Sweden.

Following the turmoil caused by the Napoleonic Wars (1803–1815), in 1816, the Faroe Islands became a county within the Danish Kingdom.

As part of its mercantilist economic policy, Denmark maintained a monopoly over trade with the Faroe Islands and forbade their inhabitants trading with others (e.g. the geographically close Britain). The trade monopoly in the Faroe Islands was abolished in 1856, after which the area developed as a modern fishing nation with its own fishing fleet. The national awakening from 1888 initially arose from a struggle to maintain the Faroese language and was thus culturally oriented, but after 1906 it became more political with the foundation of political parties within the Faroe Islands.

In the first year of the Second World War, on 12 April 1940, British troops occupied the Faroe Islands in Operation Valentine. Nazi Germany had invaded Denmark and commenced the invasion of Norway on 9 April 1940 under Operation Weserübung. In 1942–1943, the British Royal Engineers, under the command of lieutenant colonel William Law, built the first and only airport in the Faroe Islands, Vágar Airport. Following the war, control of the islands reverted to Denmark, but Danish rule had been undermined, and Iceland's full independence served as a precedent and a model in the mind of many Faroese.

The 1946 Faroese independence referendum resulted in 50.73% in favour of independence to 49.27% against. The Faroe Islands subsequently declared independence on 18 September 1946; however, this declaration was annulled by Denmark on 20 September on the grounds that a majority of the Faroese voters had not supported independence and King Christian X of Denmark dissolved the Faroese Løgting on 24 September. The dissolution of the Løgting took place in November, followed by the Faroese parliamentary election of 1946 in which the parties in favour of full independence received a total of 5,396 votes while the parties opposed to it received a total of 7,488 votes. As a reaction to the growing movements in favour of self-government and independence, Denmark finally granted the Faroe Islands home-rule with a high degree of local autonomy in 1948.

In 1973 the Faroe Islands declined to join Denmark in entering the European Economic Community (which later became the European Union). Following the collapse of the fishing industry in the early 1990s, the Faroes experienced considerable economic difficulties.

Geography 

Distance from the Faroe Islands to:
 Rona, Scotland (uninhabited): 
 Shetland (Foula), Scotland: 
 Orkney (Westray), Scotland: 
 Scotland (mainland): 
 Iceland: 
 Norway: 
 Ireland: 
 Denmark: 

The islands cover an area of 1,399 square kilometres (540 sq. mi) and have small lakes and rivers, but no major ones. The only significant uninhabited island is Lítla Dímun.

The islands are rugged and rocky with some low peaks; the coasts are mostly cliffs.

The Faroe Islands are made up of an approximately six-kilometres-thick succession of mostly basaltic lava that was part of the great North Atlantic Igneous Province during the Paleogene period. The lavas were erupted during the opening of the North Atlantic ocean, which began about 60 million years ago, and what is today the Faroe Islands was then attached to Greenland. The lavas are underlain by circa 30 km of unidentified ancient continental crust.

Climate 

The climate is classed as subpolar oceanic climate according to the Köppen climate classification: Cfc, with areas having a tundra climate, especially in the mountains, although some coastal or low-lying areas may have very mild-winter versions of a tundra climate. The overall character of the climate of the islands is influenced by the strong warming influence of the Atlantic Ocean, which produces the North Atlantic Current. This, together with the remoteness of any source of landmass-induced warm or cold airflows, ensures that winters are mild (mean temperature 3.0 to 4.0 °C or 37 to 39 °F) while summers are cool (mean temperature 9.5 to 10.5 °C or 49 to 51 °F).

The islands are windy, cloudy, and cool throughout the year with an average of 210 rainy or snowy days per year. The islands lie in the path of depressions moving northeast, making strong winds and heavy rain possible at all times of the year. Sunny days are rare and overcast days are common. Hurricane Faith struck the Faroe Islands on 5 September 1966 with sustained winds over 100 mph (160 km/h) and only then did the storm cease to be a tropical system.

The climate varies greatly over small distances, due to the altitude, ocean currents, topography, and winds. Precipitation varies considerably throughout the archipelago. In some highland areas, snow cover may last for months with snowfalls possible for the greater part of the year (on the highest peaks, summer snowfall is by no means rare), while in some sheltered coastal locations, several years pass without any snowfall whatsoever. Tórshavn receives frosts more often than other areas just a short distance to the south. Snow also is seen at a much higher frequency than on outlying islands nearby. The area receives on average 49 frosts a year.

The collection of meteorological data on the Faroe Islands began in 1867. Winter recording began in 1891, and the warmest winter occurred in 2016–17 with an average temperature of 6.1 °C (43 °F).

Flora 

The Faroes belong to the Faroe Islands boreal grasslands ecoregion. The natural vegetation of the Faroe Islands is dominated by arctic-alpine plants, wildflowers, grasses, moss, and lichen. Most of the lowland area is grassland and some is heath, dominated by shrubby heathers, mainly Calluna vulgaris. Among the herbaceous flora that occur in the Faroe Islands is the cosmopolitan marsh thistle, Cirsium palustre.

Although there are no trees native to the Faroe Islands, a limited number of species have been successfully introduced to the region, in particular trees from the Magellanic subpolar forests region of Chile. Conditions in the Magellanic subpolar forests are similar to those in the Faroe Islands, with cold summers and near-continuous subpolar winds. The following species from Tierra del Fuego, Drimys winteri, Nothofagus antarctica, Nothofagus pumilio, and Nothofagus betuloides, have been successfully introduced to the Faroe Islands. A non-Chilean species that has been introduced is the black cottonwood, also known as the California poplar (Populus trichocarpa).

A collection of Faroese marine algae resulting from a survey sponsored by NATO, the British Museum (Natural History) and the Carlsberg Foundation, is preserved in the Ulster Museum (catalogue numbers: F3195–F3307). It is one of ten exsiccatae sets. A few small plantations consisting of plants collected from similar climates such as Tierra del Fuego in South America and Alaska thrive on the islands.

Fauna

The bird fauna of the Faroe Islands is dominated by seabirds and birds attracted to open land such as heather, probably because of the lack of woodland and other suitable habitats. Many species have developed special Faroese sub-species: common eider, Common starling, Eurasian wren, common murre, and black guillemot. The pied raven, a colour morph of the North Atlantic subspecies of the common raven, was endemic to the Faroe Islands, but now has become extinct.

Only a few species of wild land mammals are found in the Faroe Islands today, all introduced by humans. Three species are thriving on the islands today: mountain hare (Lepus timidus), brown rat (Rattus norvegicus), and the house mouse (Mus musculus). Apart from these, there is a local domestic sheep breed, the Faroe sheep (depicted on the coat of arms), and there once was a variety of feral sheep, which survived on Lítla Dímun until the mid-nineteenth century.

Grey seals (Halichoerus grypus) are common around the shorelines. Several species of cetacea live in the waters around the Faroe Islands. Best known are the long-finned pilot whales (Globicephala melaena), which still are hunted by the islanders in accordance with longstanding local tradition. Orcas (Orcinus orca) are regular visitors around the islands.

The domestic animals of the Faroe Islands are a result of 1,200 years of isolated breeding. As a result, many of the islands' domestic animals are found nowhere else in the world. Faroese domestic breeds include Faroe pony, Faroe cow, Faroe sheep, Faroese goose, and Faroese duck.

Geology 

The islands were built up during a period characterised by high volcanic activity in the Early Palaeogene around 50-60 million years ago. The islands are built up in layers of different lava flows (basalt) alternating with thin layers of volcanic ash (tuff). The soft ash and the hard basalt thus lie layer upon layer in narrow and thick strips. The soft tuff or ash zones erode away relatively quickly, and the hard lump of basalt above the eroded tuff falls away, forming the first terrace.

Volcanic activity has varied over millions of years, with periods of quiescence and various periods of quiet eruptive fissures and explosive volcanism. In a few places, mainly on Suðuroy, thin layers of coal are present, which are the remains of swamp forests from the time between volcanic eruptions. The plateau has therefore been divided into different basalt series according to the course of volcanism and the age sequence of the layers.

There are major differences in the shape of the islands' terraces. The lowest and oldest series are thick lava deposits that can be seen on the southern part of Suðuroy, Mykines, Tindhólmur and the western side of Vágar. The basalts of the lower basalt series are often pillared, which is shown by elongated, angular and regular pillars in the mountain side.

The middle basalt series consists of thin lava flows with a highly porous interlayer. This series has very little resistance to crumbling and weathering. As these erosion processes are more severe at higher altitudes than lower down, the lowlands are filled with weathering material from the heights, often resulting in a characteristic curved landscape shape. This can be clearly seen on Vágar, the northernmost part of Streymoy and on the north-western part of Eysturoy.

Glacial activity has reduced plateau surfaces, especially on the northern islands, where the surfaces have been reduced to a series of narrower or wider zig-zag rows along the length of the islands. The phenomenon is particularly pronounced on the islands of Kunoy, Kalsoy and Borðoy, where an eastward and a westward ice mass have eroded the intervening mountain range into a narrow ridge.

Government and politics 

The Faroe Islands are a self-governing nation under the external sovereignty of the Kingdom of Denmark. The Faroese government holds executive power in local government affairs. The head of the government is called the Løgmaður ("Chief Justice") and serves as Prime Minister and head of Faroese Government. Any other member of the cabinet is called a landsstýrismaður/ráðharri ("Male Minister of the Faroese Government") or landsstýriskvinna/ráðfrú ("Female Minister of the Faroese Government"). The Faroese parliament – the Løgting ("Law Thing") – dates back to the early days of settlement and claims to be one of the longest functioning parliaments in the world, alongside the Icelandic Althing and the Manx Tynwald. The parliament currently has 33 members.

Elections are held at municipal and national levels, additionally electing two members to the Folketing. Until 2007, there were seven electoral districts, which were abolished on 25 October of that year in favour of a single nationwide district.

Administrative divisions 

Administratively, the islands are divided into 29 municipalities (kommunur) within which there are 120 or so settlements.

There are also the six traditional sýslur: Norðoyar, Eysturoy, Streymoy, Vágar, Sandoy, and Suðuroy. While no longer of any legal significance, the term is still commonly used to indicate a geographical region. In earlier times, each sýsla had its own assembly, the so-called várting ("spring assembly").

Relationship with Denmark 

The Faroe Islands have been under Norwegian-Danish control since 1388. The 1814 Treaty of Kiel terminated the Danish–Norwegian union, and Norway came under the rule of the King of Sweden, while the Faroe Islands, Iceland, and Greenland remained Danish possessions. From ancient times the Faroe Islands had a parliament (Løgting), which was abolished in 1816, and the Faroe Islands were to be governed as an ordinary Danish amt (county), with the Amtmand as its head of government. In 1851, the Løgting was reinstated, but, until 1948, served mainly as an advisory body.

The islands are home to a notable independence movement that has seen an increase in popular support within recent decades. At the end of World War II, some of the population favoured independence from Denmark, and on 14 September 1946, an independence referendum was held on the question of secession. It was a consultative referendum, the parliament not being bound to follow the people's vote. This was the first time that the Faroese people had been asked whether they favoured independence or wanted to continue within the Danish kingdom.

The result of the vote was only a slight majority in favour of secession. The Speaker of the Løgting, together with the majority, initiated the process of becoming an independent state. The minority of the Løgting left in protest, regarding these actions as illegal. One parliament member, Jákup í Jákupsstovu, was shunned by his own party, the Social Democratic Party, for having joined the majority of the Løgting.

The Speaker of the Løgting declared the Faroe Islands independent on 18 September 1946.

On 25 September 1946, a Danish prefect announced to the Løgting that the king, rejecting the majority vote, had dissolved the parliament and ordered new elections.

A parliamentary election was held a few months later, in which the political parties that favoured remaining in the Danish kingdom increased their share of the vote and formed a coalition. Based on this, they chose to reject secession. Instead, a compromise was reached and the Folketing passed a home-rule law that went into effect in 1948. The Faroe Islands' status as a Danish amt was thereby brought to an end; the Faroe Islands were given a high degree of self-governance, supported by a financial subsidy from Denmark to recompense expenses the islands have on Danish services.

In protest against the new Home Rule Act, Republic (Tjóðveldi), was founded.

At present, the islanders are about evenly split between those favouring independence and those who prefer to continue as a part of the Kingdom of Denmark. Within both camps there is a wide range of opinions. Of those who favour independence, some are in favour of an immediate unilateral declaration of independence. Others see independence as something to be attained gradually and with the full consent of the Danish government and the Danish nation. In the unionist camp, there are also many who foresee and welcome a gradual increase in autonomy even while strong ties with Denmark are maintained.

Two attempts have been made to draft a separate Faroese constitution. The first time in 2011, when the then prime minister Lars Løkke Rasmussen denounced it as incompatible with Denmark's constitution, stating that if the Faroe Islands wished to continue with the move, they must declare independence. A second attempt was made in 2015, facing similar criticisms before eventually being withdrawn without a vote.

Relationship with the European Union 

As explicitly asserted by both treaties of the European Union, the Faroe Islands are not part of the European Union. The Faroes are not grouped with the EU when it comes to international trade; for instance, when the EU and Russia imposed reciprocal trade sanctions on each other over the War in Donbas in 2014, the Faroes began exporting significant amounts of fresh salmon to Russia. Moreover, a protocol to the treaty of accession of Denmark to the European Communities stipulates that Danish nationals residing in the Faroe Islands are not considered Danish nationals within the meaning of the treaties. Hence, Danish people living in the Faroes are not citizens of the European Union (though other EU nationals living there remain EU citizens). The Faroes are not covered by the Schengen Agreement, but there are no border checks when travelling between the Faroes and any Schengen country (the Faroes have been part of the Nordic Passport Union since 1966, and since 2001 there have been no permanent border checks between the Nordic countries and the rest of the Schengen Area as part of the Schengen agreement).

Relationship with international organisations 
The Faroe Islands are not fully independent, but they do have political relations directly with other countries through agreement with Denmark. The Faroe Islands are a member of some international organisations as though they were an independent country. The Faroes have associate membership in the Nordic Council but have expressed wishes for full membership.

The Faroe Islands are a member of several international sports federations like UEFA, FIFA in football and FINA in swimming and EHF in handball and have their own national teams. They also have their own telephone country code, +298, Internet country code top-level domain, .fo, banking code FO and postal code system.

The Faroe Islands make their own agreements with other countries regarding trade and commerce. When the EU embargo against Russia started in 2014, the Faroe Islands were not a part of the embargo because they are not a part of EU, and the islands had just themselves experienced a year of embargo from the EU including Denmark against the islands; the Faroese prime minister Kaj Leo Johannesen went to Moscow to negotiate the trade between Russia and the Faroe Islands. The Faroese minister of fisheries negotiates with the EU and other countries regarding the rights to fish.

In mid-2005, representatives of the Faroe Islands raised the possibility of their territory joining the European Free Trade Association (EFTA). According to Article 56 of the EFTA Convention, only states may become members of the EFTA. The Faroes are an autonomous territory of the Kingdom of Denmark, and not a sovereign state in their own right. Consequently, they considered the possibility that the "Kingdom of Denmark in respect of the Faroes" could join the EFTA, though the Danish Government has stated that this mechanism would not allow the Faroes to become a separate member of the EEA because Denmark was already a party to the EEA Agreement. The Government of Denmark officially supports new membership of the EFTA with effect for the Faroe Islands.

Demographics 

The vast majority of the population are ethnic Faroese, of Norse and Celtic descent. Recent DNA analyses have revealed that Y chromosomes, tracing male descent, are 87% Scandinavian.
The studies show that mitochondrial DNA, tracing female descent, is 84% Celtic.

There is a gender deficit of about 2,000 women owing to migration. As a result, some Faroese men have married women from the Philippines and Thailand, whom they met through such channels as online dating websites, and arranged for them to emigrate to the islands. This group of approximately three hundred women make up the largest ethnic minority in the Faroes.

The total fertility rate of the Faroe Islands is one of the highest in Europe. The 2015 fertility rate was 2.409 children born per woman.

The 2011 census shows that of the 48,346 inhabitants of the Faroe Islands (17,441 private households in 2011), 43,135 were born in the Faroe Islands, 3,597 were born elsewhere in the Kingdom of Denmark (Denmark proper or Greenland), and 1,614 were born outside the Kingdom of Denmark. People were also asked about their nationality, including Faroese. Children under 15 were not asked about their nationality. 97% said that they were ethnic Faroese, which means that many of those who were born in either Denmark or Greenland consider themselves as ethnic Faroese. The other 3% of those older than 15 said they were not Faroese: 515 were Danish, 433 were from other European countries, 147 came from Asia, 65 from Africa, 55 from the Americas, 23 from Russia. The Faroe Islands have people from 77 different nationalities.

If the first inhabitants of the Faroe Islands were Irish monks, they must have lived as a very small group of settlers. Later, when the Vikings colonised the islands, there was a considerable increase in the population. However, it never exceeded 5,000 until the 19th century. Around 1349, about half the population perished in the Black Death plague.

Only with the rise of the deep-sea fishery (and thus independence from agriculture in the islands' harsh terrain) and with general progress in the health service was rapid population growth possible in the Faroes. Beginning in the 19th century, the population increased tenfold in 200 years.

At the beginning of the 1990s, the Faroe Islands entered a deep economic crisis leading to heavy emigration; however, this trend reversed in subsequent years to a net immigration. This has been in the form of a population replacement as young Faroese women leave and are replaced with Asian/Pacific brides.
In 2011, there were 2,155 more men than women between the age of 0 to 59 in the Faroe Islands.

The Faroese population is spread across most of the area; it was not until recent decades that significant urbanisation occurred. Industrialisation has been remarkably decentralised. Nevertheless, villages with poor harbour facilities have been the losers in the development from agriculture to fishing, and in the most peripheral agricultural areas, also known as Útoyggjar ("Outer Islands"), there are few young people. In recent decades, the village-based social structure has given way to a rise in interconnected "centres" that are better able to provide goods and services than the badly connected periphery. Shops and services are relocating en masse from the villages into the centres, and slowly but steadily the Faroese population is concentrating in and around the centres.

In the 1990s, the government abandoned the old national policy of developing the villages (Bygdamenning), and instead began a process of regional development (Økismenning). The term "region" referred to the large islands of the Faroes. Nevertheless, the government was unable to press through the structural reform of merging small rural municipalities to create sustainable, decentralised entities that could drive forward regional development. As regional development has been difficult on the administrative level, the government has instead invested heavily in infrastructure, interconnecting the regions.

Language

As stipulated in section 11 (§ 11) in the 1948 Home Rule Act, Faroese is the primary and official language of the country, whereas Danish is taught in schools and can be used by the Faroese government in public relations, with public services providing Danish translations of documents on request. Faroese belongs to the North Germanic language branch and is descended from Old Norse, being most closely related to Icelandic. Due to its geographic isolation, it has preserved more conservative grammatical features that have been lost in Danish, Norwegian and Swedish. It is the only language alongside Icelandic and Elfdalian to preserve the letter Ð, though unlike the others, it is not pronounced.

Faroese sign language was officially adopted as a national language in 2017.

Religion 

According to the Færeyinga saga, Sigmundur Brestisson brought Christianity to the islands in 999. However, archaeology at a site in Toftanes, Leirvík, named Bønhústoftin (English: prayer-house ruin) and over a dozen slabs from Ólansgarður in the small island of Skúvoy which in the main display encircled linear and outline crosses, suggest that Celtic Christianity may have arrived at least 150 years earlier. The Faroe Islands' Church Reformation was completed on 1 January 1540. According to official statistics from 2019, 79.7% of the Faroese population are members of the state church, the Church of the Faroe Islands (Fólkakirkjan), following a form of Lutheranism. The Fólkakirkjan became an independent church in 2007; previously it had been a diocese within the Church of Denmark. Faroese members of the clergy who have had historical importance include Venceslaus Ulricus Hammershaimb (1819–1909), Fríðrikur Petersen (1853–1917) and, perhaps most significantly, Jákup Dahl (1878–1944), who had a great influence in ensuring that the Faroese language was spoken in the church instead of Danish. Participation in churches is more prevalent among the Faroese population than among most other Scandinavians.

In the late 1820s, the Christian Evangelical religious movement, the Plymouth Brethren, was established in England. In 1865, a member of this movement, William Gibson Sloan, travelled to the Faroes from Shetland. At the turn of the 20th century, the Faroese Plymouth Brethren numbered thirty. Today, around 10% of the Faroese population are members of the Open Brethren community (Brøðrasamkoman). About 3% belong to the Charismatic Movement. There are several charismatic churches around the islands, the largest of which, called Keldan (The Spring), has about 200 to 300 members. About 2% belong to other Christian groups. The Adventists operate a private school in Tórshavn. Jehovah's Witnesses also have four congregations with a total of 121 members. The Roman Catholic congregation has about 270 members and falls under the jurisdiction of Denmark's Roman Catholic Diocese of Copenhagen. The municipality of Tórshavn has an old Franciscan school.

Unlike Denmark, Sweden and Iceland, the Faroes have no organised Heathen community.

The best-known church buildings in the Faroe Islands include Tórshavn Cathedral, Olaf II of Norway's Church and the Magnus Cathedral in Kirkjubøur; the Vesturkirkjan and the St. Mary's Church, both of which are situated in Tórshavn; the church of Fámjin; the octagonal church in Haldórsvík; Christianskirkjan in Klaksvík; and also the two pictured here.

In 1948, Victor Danielsen completed the first Bible translation into Faroese from different modern languages. Jacob Dahl and Kristian Osvald Viderø (Fólkakirkjan) completed the second translation in 1961. The latter was translated from the original Biblical languages (Hebrew and Greek) into Faroese.

According to the 2011 Census, there were 33,018 Christians (95.44%), 23 Muslims (0.07%), 7 Hindus (0.02%), 66 Buddhists (0.19%), 12 Jews (0.03%), 13 Baháʼís (0.04%), 3 Sikhs (0.01%), 149 others (0.43%), 85 with more than one belief (0.25%), and 1,397 with no religion (4.04%).

Education 

The levels of education in the Faroe Islands are primary, secondary and higher education. Most institutions are funded by the state; there are few private schools in the Faroe Islands. Education is compulsory for 9 years between the ages of 7 and 16.

Compulsory education consists of seven years of primary education and two years of lower secondary education; it is public, free of charge, provided by the respective municipalities, and is called the Fólkaskúli in Faroese. The Fólkaskúli also provides optional preschool education as well as the tenth year of education that is a prerequisite to getting admitted to upper secondary education. Students that complete compulsory education are allowed to continue education in a vocational school, where they can have job-specific training and education. Since the fishing industry is an important part of Faroe Islands' economy, maritime schools are an important part of Faroese education. Upon completion of the tenth year of Fólkaskúli, students can continue to upper secondary education which consists of several different types of schools. Higher education is offered at the University of the Faroe Islands; a part of Faroese youth moves abroad to pursue higher education, mainly in Denmark. Other forms of education comprise adult education and music schools. The structure of the Faroese educational system bears resemblances with its Danish counterpart.

In the 12th century, education was provided by the Catholic Church in the Faroe Islands. The Church of Denmark took over education after the Protestant Reformation.
Modern educational institutions started operating in the last quarter of the nineteenth century and developed throughout the twentieth century. The status of the Faroese language in education was a significant issue for decades, until it was accepted as a language of instruction in 1938. Initially education was administered and regulated by Denmark. In 1979 responsibilities on educational issues started transferring to the Faroese authorities, a procedure which was completed in 2002.

The Ministry of Education, Research and Culture has the jurisdiction of educational responsibility in the Faroe Islands. Since the Faroe Islands is a part of the Danish Realm, education in the Faroe Islands is influenced and has similarities with the Danish educational system; there is an agreement on educational cooperation between the Faroe Islands and Denmark. In 2012 the public spending on education was 8.1% of GDP. The municipalities are responsible for the school buildings for children's education in Fólkaskúlin from age 1st grade to 9th or 10th grade (age 7 to 16). In November 2013 1,615 people, or 6.8% of the total number of employees, were employed in the education sector. Of the 31,270 people aged 25 and above 1,717 (5.5%) have gained at least a master's degrees or a Ph.D., 8,428 (27%) have gained a B.Sc. or a diploma, 11,706 (37.4%) have finished upper secondary education while 9,419 (30.1%) has only finished primary school and have no other education. There is no data on literacy in the Faroe Islands, but the CIA Factbook states that it is probably as high as in Denmark proper, i.e. 99%.

The majority of students in upper secondary schools are women, although men represent the majority in higher education institutions. In addition, most young Faroese people who relocate to other countries to study are women. Out of 8,535 holders of bachelor degrees, 4,796 (56.2%) have had their education in the Faroe Islands, 2,724 (31.9%) in Denmark, 543 in both the Faroe Islands and Denmark, 94 (1.1%) in Norway, 80 in the United Kingdom and the rest in other countries. Out of 1,719 holders of master's degrees or PhDs, 1,249 (72.7%) have had their education in Denmark, 87 (5.1%) in the United Kingdom, 86 (5%) in both the Faroe Islands and Denmark, 64 (3.7%) in the Faroe Islands, 60 (3.5%) in Norway and the rest in other countries (mostly EU and Nordic).

Economy 

Economic troubles caused by a collapse of the Faroese fishing industry in the early 1990s brought high unemployment rates of 10 to 15% by the mid-1990s. Unemployment decreased in the later 1990s, down to about 6% at the end of 1998. By June 2008 unemployment had declined to 1.1%, before rising to 3.4% in early 2009. In December 2019 the unemployment reached a record low 0.9%. Nevertheless, the almost total dependence on fishing and fish farming means that the economy remains vulnerable. One of the biggest private companies of the Faroe Islands is the salmon farming company Bakkafrost, which is the largest of the four salmon farming companies in the Faroe Islands and the eighth biggest in the world.

In 2011, 13% of the Faroe Islands' national income consists of economic aid from Denmark, corresponding to roughly 5% of GDP.

Since 2000, the government has fostered new information technology and business projects to attract new investment. The introduction of Burger King in Tórshavn was widely publicized as a sign of the globalization of Faroese culture. It remains to be seen whether these projects will succeed in broadening the islands' economic base. The islands have one of the lowest unemployment rates in Europe, but this should not necessarily be taken as a sign of a recovering economy, as many young students move to Denmark and other countries after leaving high school. This leaves a largely middle-aged and elderly population that may lack the skills and knowledge to fill newly developed positions on the Faroes. Nonetheless, in 2008 the Faroes were able to make a $52 million loan to Iceland in the wake of the 2008 financial crisis.

On 5 August 2009, two opposition parties introduced a bill in the Løgting to adopt the euro as the national currency, pending a referendum. The euro was not adopted.

Transport 

By road, the main islands are connected by bridges and tunnels. Government-owned Strandfaraskip Landsins provides public bus and ferry service to the main towns and villages. There are no railways.

By air, Scandinavian Airlines and the government-owned Atlantic Airways both have scheduled international flights to Vágar Airport, the islands' only airport. Atlantic Airways also provides helicopter service to each of the islands. All civil aviation matters are controlled from the Civil Aviation Administration Denmark.

By sea, Smyril Line operates a regular international passenger, car and freight service linking the Faroe Islands with Seyðisfjörður, Iceland and Hirtshals, Denmark.

Because of the rugged terrain, road transport in the Faroe Islands was not as extensive as in other parts of the world. This has now changed, and the infrastructure has been developed extensively. Some 80 percent of the population of the islands is connected by tunnels through the mountains and between the islands, bridges and causeways that link together the three largest islands and three other islands to the northeast. While the other two large islands to the south, Sandoy and Suðuroy, are connected to the main area with ferries, the small islands Koltur and Stóra Dímun have no ferry connection, only a helicopter service. Other small islands—Mykines to the west, Kalsoy, Svínoy and Fugloy to the north, Hestur west of Streymoy, and Nólsoy east of Tórshavn—have smaller ferries and some of these islands also have a helicopter service.

In February 2014 all the political parties of the Løgting agreed on making two new subsea tunnels, one between Streymoy and Eysturoy (the Eysturoyartunnilin) and one between Streymoy and Sandoy (Sandoyartunnilin). The plan was that both tunnels should open in 2021 and not be private. The work to dig the Eysturoy-tunnel started on 1 March 2016 above the village of Hvítanes near Tórshavn, and it opened for traffic in late 2020. The Sandoyartunnilin is now expected to open in late 2023.

Culture

The culture of the Faroe Islands has its roots in the Nordic culture. The Faroe Islands were long isolated from the main cultural phases and movements that swept across parts of Europe. This means that they have maintained a great part of their traditional culture. The language spoken is Faroese, which is one of three insular North Germanic languages descended from the Old Norse language spoken in Scandinavia in the Viking Age, the others being Icelandic and the extinct Norn, which is thought to have been mutually intelligible with Faroese. Until the 15th century, Faroese had a similar orthography to Icelandic and Norwegian, but after the Reformation in 1538, the ruling Norwegians outlawed its use in schools, churches and official documents. Although a rich spoken tradition survived, for 300 years the language was not written down. This means that all poems and stories were handed down orally. These works were split into the following divisions: sagnir (historical), ævintýr (stories) and kvæði (ballads), often set to music and the medieval chain dance. These were eventually written down in the 19th century.

Faroese literature

Faroese written literature has developed only in the past 100–200 years. This is mainly because of the islands' isolation, and also because the Faroese language did not have a standardised writing system. The Danish language was also encouraged at the expense of Faroese. Nevertheless, the Faroes have produced several authors and poets. A rich centuries-old oral tradition of folk tales and Faroese folk songs accompanied the Faroese chain dance. The people learned these songs and stories by heart, and told or sang them to each other, teaching the younger generations too. This kind of literature was gathered in the 19th century and early 20th century. The Faroese folk songs, in Faroese called kvæði, are still in use although not so large-scale as earlier.

The first Faroese novel, Bábelstornið by Regin í Líð, was published in 1909; the second novel was published 18 years later. In the period 1930 to 1940 a writer from the village Skálavík on Sandoy island, Heðin Brú, published three novels: Lognbrá (1930), Fastatøkur (1935) and Feðgar á ferð (English title: The old man and his sons) (1940). Feðgar á ferð has been translated into several other languages. Martin Joensen from Sandvík wrote about life on Faroese fishing vessels; he published the novels Fiskimenn (1946) and Tað lýsir á landi (1952).

Well-known poets from the early 20th century are among others the two brothers from Tórshavn: Hans Andrias Djurhuus (1883–1951) and Janus Djurhuus (1881–1948), other well known poets from this period and the mid 20th century are Poul F. Joensen (1898–1970), Regin Dahl (1918–2007) and Tummas Napoleon Djurhuus (1928–71). Their poems are popular even today and can be found in Faroese song books and school books. Jens Pauli Heinesen (1932–2011), a school teacher from Sandavágur, was the most productive Faroese novelist, he published 17 novels. Steinbjørn B. Jacobsen (1937–2012), a schoolteacher from Sandvík, wrote short stories, plays, children's books and even novels. Most Faroese writers write in Faroese; two exceptions are William Heinesen (1900–91) and Jørgen-Frantz Jacobsen (1900–38).

Women were not so visible in the early Faroese literature except for Helena Patursson (1864–1916), but in the last decades of the 20th century and in the beginning of the 21st century female writers like Ebba Hentze (born 1933) wrote children's books, short stories, etc. Guðrið Helmsdal published the first modernistic collection of poems, Lýtt lot, in 1963, which at the same time was the first collection of Faroese poems written by a woman. Her daughter, Rakel Helmsdal (born 1966), is also a writer, best known for her children's books, for which she has won several prizes and nominations. Other female writers are the novelists Oddvør Johansen (born 1941), Bergtóra Hanusardóttir (born 1946) and novelist/children's books writers Marianna Debes Dahl (born 1947), and Sólrun Michelsen (born 1948). Other modern Faroese writers include Gunnar Hoydal (born 1941), Hanus Kamban (born 1942), Jógvan Isaksen (born 1950), Jóanes Nielsen (born 1953), Tóroddur Poulsen and Carl Jóhan Jensen (born 1957). Some of these writers have been nominated for the Nordic Council's Literature Prize two to six times, but have never won it. The only Faroese writer who writes in Faroese who has won the prize is the poet Rói Patursson (born 1947), who won the prize in 1986 for Líkasum. In 2007 the first
ever Faroese/German anthology "From Janus Djurhuus to Tóroddur Poulsen – Faroese Poetry during 100 Years", edited by Paul Alfred Kleinert, including a short history of Faroese literature was published in Leipzig,.

In the 21st century, some new writers had success in the Faroe Islands and abroad. Bárður Oskarsson (born 1972) is a children's book writer and illustrator; his books won prizes in the Faroes, Germany and the West Nordic Council's Children and Youth Literature Prize (2006). Though not born in the Faroe Islands, Matthew Landrum, an American poet and editor for Structo magazine, has written a collection of poems about the Islands. Sissal Kampmann (born 1974) won the Danish literary prize Klaus Rifbjerg's Debutant Prize (2012), and Rakel Helmsdal has won Faroese and Icelandic awards; she has been nominated for the West Nordic Council's Children and Youth Literature Prize and the Children and Youth Literature Prize of the Nordic Council (representing Iceland, wrote the book together with and Icelandic and a Swedish writer/illustrator). Marjun Syderbø Kjelnæs (born 1974) had success with her first novel Skriva í sandin for teenagers; the book was awarded and nominated both in the Faroes and in other countries. She won the Nordic Children's Book Prize (2011) for this book, White Raven Deutsche Jugendbibliothek (2011) and nominated the West Nordic Council's Children and Youth Literature Prize and the Children and Youth Literature Prize of the Nordic Council (2013).

Music

The Faroe Islands have an active music scene, with live music being a regular part of the Islands' life and many Faroese being proficient at a number of instruments. Multiple Danish Music Award winner Teitur Lassen calls the Faroes home and is arguably the islands' most internationally well-known musical export.

The Islands have their own orchestra (the classical ensemble Aldubáran) and many different choirs; the best-known of these is Havnarkórið. The best-known local Faroese composers are Sunleif Rasmussen and Kristian Blak, who is also head of the record company Tutl. The first Faroese opera was by Sunleif Rasmussen. It is entitled Í Óðamansgarði (The Madman's Garden) and was premiered on 12 October 2006 at the Nordic House. The opera is based on a short story by the writer William Heinesen.

Young Faroese musicians who have gained much popularity recently are Eivør Pálsdóttir, Anna Katrin Egilstrøð, Lena (Lena Andersen), Høgni Reistrup, Høgni Lisberg, HEIÐRIK (Heiðrik á Heygum), Guðrið Hansdóttir and Brandur Enni.  In 2023, Reiley became the first Faroese person to represent Denmark at the Eurovision Song Contest.

Well-known bands include Týr, Gestir, Hamferð, The Ghost, Boys in a Band, ORKA, 200, Grandma's Basement, SIC, and the former band Clickhaze.

The festival of contemporary and classical music, Summartónar, is held each summer. The G! Festival in Norðragøta in July and Summarfestivalurin in Klaksvík in August are both large, open-air music festivals for popular music with both local and international musicians participating. Havnar Jazzfelag was established 21 November 1975, and is still active. Currently Havnar Jazzfelag is arranging VetrarJazz amongst other jazz-festivals in The Faroe Islands.

The Nordic House in the Faroe Islands
The Nordic House in the Faroe Islands is the most important cultural institution in the Faroes. Its aim is to support and promote Scandinavian and Faroese culture, locally and in the Nordic region. Erlendur Patursson (1913–86), Faroese member of the Nordic Council, raised the idea of a Nordic cultural house in the Faroe Islands. A Nordic competition for architects was held in 1977, in which 158 architects participated. Winners were Ola Steen from Norway and Kolbrún Ragnarsdóttir from Iceland. By staying true to folklore, the architects built the Nordic House to resemble an enchanted hill of elves. The house opened in Tórshavn in 1983. The Nordic House is a cultural organization under the Nordic Council. The Nordic House is run by a steering committee of eight, of whom three are Faroese and five from other Nordic countries. There is also a local advisory body of fifteen members, representing Faroese cultural organizations. The House is managed by a director appointed by the steering committee for a four-year term.

Traditional food

Traditional Faroese food is mainly based on meat, seafood and potatoes and uses few fresh vegetables. Mutton of the Faroe sheep is the basis of many meals, and one of the most popular treats is skerpikjøt, well aged, wind-dried mutton, which is quite chewy. The drying shed, known as a hjallur, is a standard feature in many Faroese homes, particularly in the small towns and villages. Other traditional foods are ræst kjøt (semi-dried mutton) and ræstur fiskur, matured fish. Another Faroese specialty is tvøst og spik, made from pilot whale meat and blubber. (A parallel meat/fat dish made with offal is garnatálg.) The tradition of consuming meat and blubber from pilot whales arises from the fact that a single kill can provide many meals. Fresh fish also features strongly in the traditional local diet, as do seabirds, such as Faroese puffins, and their eggs. Dried fish is also commonly eaten.

There are two breweries in the Faroe Islands. The first brewery is called Föroya Bjór and has produced beer since 1888 with exports mainly to Iceland and Denmark. The second brewery is called Okkara Bryggjarí and was founded in 2010. A local specialty is fredrikk, a special brew made in Nólsoy. Production of hard alcohol such as snaps is forbidden in the Faroe Islands, hence the Faroese akvavit is produced abroad.

Since the friendly British occupation, the Faroese have been fond of British food, in particular British-style chocolate such as Cadbury Dairy Milk, which is found in many of the island's shops.

Whaling

There are records of drive hunts in the Faroe Islands dating from 1584. Whaling in the Faroe Islands is regulated by Faroese authorities but not by the International Whaling Commission as there are disagreements about the commission's legal authority to regulate cetacean hunts. Hundreds of long-finned pilot whales (Globicephala melaena) could be killed in a year, mainly during the summer. The hunts, called grindadráp in Faroese, are non-commercial and are organized on a community level; anyone can participate. When a whale pod by chance is spotted near land the participating hunters first surround the pilot whales with a wide semicircle of boats and then slowly and quietly begin to drive the whales towards the chosen authorised bay. When a pod of whales has been stranded the killing is begun.

Faroese animal welfare legislation, which also applies to whaling, requires that animals are killed as quickly and with as little suffering as possible. A regulation spinal lance is used to sever the spinal cord, which also severs the major blood supply to the brain, ensuring both loss of consciousness and death within seconds. The spinal lance has been introduced as preferred standard equipment for killing pilot whales and has been shown to reduce killing time to 1–2 seconds.

This "grindadráp" is legal and provides food for many people in the Faroe Islands. However, a study has found whale meat and blubber to currently be contaminated with mercury and not recommended for human consumption, as too much may cause such adverse health effects as birth defects of the nervous system, high blood pressure, damaged immune system, increased risk for developing Parkinson's disease, hypertension, arteriosclerosis, and Diabetes mellitus type 2:

Animal rights groups such as the Sea Shepherd Conservation Society criticize it as being cruel and unnecessary, since it is no longer necessary as a food source for the Faroese people.

The sustainability of the Faroese pilot whale hunt has been discussed, but with a long-term average catch of around 800 pilot whales on the Faroe Islands a year the hunt is not considered to have a significant impact on the pilot whale population. There are an estimated 128,000 pilot whales in the Northeast Atlantic, and Faroese whaling is therefore considered a sustainable catch by the Faroese government. Annual records of whale drives and strandings of pilot whales and other small cetaceans provide over 400 years of documentation, including statistics, and represents one of the most comprehensive historical records of wildlife utilization anywhere in the world.

On 12 September 2021, a super-pod of over 1,420 white-sided dolphins were killed, an event that has caused significant debate in the Faroe Islands and internationally. The UK Government declined to suspend its free-trade agreement with the Faroese, having been called upon by conservationists to do so.

Sports
The Faroe Islands have competed in every biennial Island Games since they were established in 1985. The games were hosted by the islands in 1989 and Faroes won the Island Games in 2009.

Football is by far the biggest sports activity on the islands, with 7,000 registered players out of the whole population of 52,000. Ten football teams contest the Faroe Islands Premier League, currently ranked 51st by UEFA's League coefficient. The Faroe Islands are a full member of UEFA and the Faroe Islands national football team competes in the UEFA European Football Championship qualifiers. The Faroe Islands is also a full member of FIFA and therefore the Faroe Islands football team also competes in the FIFA World Cup qualifiers. The Faroe Islands won its first ever competitive match when the team defeated Austria 1–0 in a UEFA Euro 1992 qualifying.

The nation's biggest success in football came in 2014 after defeating Greece 1–0, a result that was considered "the biggest shock of all time" in football thanks to a 169-place distance between the teams in the FIFA World Rankings when the match was played. The team climbed 82 places to 105 on the FIFA ranking after the 1–0 win against Greece. The team went on to defeat Greece again on 13 June 2015 by a score of 2–1. On 9 July 2015 the national football team of the Faroes climbed another 28 places up on the FIFA ranking. Recently, Faroe Islands had achieved another famous victory, as they beat Turkey 2–1 in the 2022–23 UEFA Nations League C, although this shock win didn't prevent Turkey from achieving promotion to League B.

The Faroe Islands men's national handball team won the first two editions of the IHF Emerging Nations Championship, in 2015, and 2017.

The Faroe Islands are a full member of FINA and compete under their own flag at World Championships, European Championships and World Cup events. The Faroese swimmer Pál Joensen (born 1990) won a bronze medal at the 2012 FINA World Swimming Championships (25 m) and four silver medals at the European Championships (2010, 2013 and 2014), all medals won in the men's longest and second longest distance the 1500 and 800 metre freestyle, short and long course. The Faroe Islands also compete in the Paralympics and have won 1 gold, 7 silver, and 5 bronze medals since the 1984 Summer Paralympics.

Two Faroese athletes have competed at the Olympics, but under the Danish flag, since the Olympic Committee does not allow the Faroe Islands to compete under its own flag. The two Faroese who have competed are the swimmer Pál Joensen in 2012 and the rower Katrin Olsen. She competed at the 2008 Summer Olympics in double sculler light weight together with Juliane Rasmussen. Another Faroese rower, who is a member of the Danish National rowing team, is Sverri Sandberg Nielsen, who currently competes in single sculler, heavy weight, he has also competed in double sculler. He is the current Danish record holder in the men's indoor rowing, heavy weight; he broke a nine-year-old record in January 2015 and improved it in January 2016. He has also competed at the 2015 World Rowing Championships making it to the semifinal; he competed at the 2015 World Rowing Championship under-23 and made it to the final where he placed fourth.

The Faroe Islands applied to the IOC for full Faroese membership in 1984, but  the Faroe Islands are still not a member of the IOC. At the 2015 European Games in Baku, Azerbaijan, the Faroe Islands were not allowed to compete under the Faroese flag; they were, however, allowed to compete under the Ligue Européenne de Natation flag. Before this, the Faroese prime minister Kaj Leo Holm Johannesen had a meeting with the IOC president Thomas Bach in Lausanne on 21 May 2015 to discuss Faroese membership in the IOC.

Faroese people are very active in sports; they have domestic competitions in football, handball, volleyball, badminton, swimming, outdoor rowing (Faroese kappróður) and indoor rowing in rowing machines, horse riding, shooting, table tennis, judo, golf, tennis, archery, gymnastics, cycling, triathlon, running, and other competitions in athletics.

During 2014, the Faroe Islands was given the opportunity to compete in the Electronic Sports European Championship (ESEC) in esports. 5 players, all of Faroese nationality, faced Slovenia in the first round, eventually getting knocked out with a 0–2 score.

At the 2016 Baku Chess Olympiad, the Faroe Islands got their first chess grandmaster. Helgi Ziska won his third GM norm, and thus won the title of chess grandmaster.

The Faroe Islands was given another chance to compete internationally in esports, this time at the 2018 Northern European Minor Championship. The team captain was Rókur Dam Norðoy.

Clothing

Faroese handicrafts are mainly based on materials available to local villages—mainly wool. Garments include sweaters, scarves, and gloves. Faroese jumpers have distinct Nordic patterns; each village has some regional variations handed down from mother to daughter. There has recently been a strong revival of interest in Faroese knitting, with young people knitting and wearing updated versions of old patterns emphasized by strong colours and bold patterns. This appears to be a reaction to the loss of traditional lifestyles, and as a way to maintain and assert cultural tradition in a rapidly-changing society. Many young people study and move abroad, and this helps them maintain cultural links with their specific Faroese heritage.

There has also been a great interest in Faroese sweaters from the TV series The Killing, where the main actress (Detective Inspector Sarah Lund, played by Sofie Gråbøl) wears Faroese sweaters.

Lace knitting is a traditional handicraft. The most distinctive trait of Faroese lace shawls is the centre-back gusset shaping. Each shawl consists of two triangular side panels, a trapezoid-shaped back gusset, an edge treatment, and usually shoulder shaping. These are worn by all generations of women, particularly as part of the traditional Faroese costume as an overgarment.

The traditional Faroese national dress is also a local handicraft that people spend a lot of time, money, and effort to assemble. It is worn at weddings and traditional dancing events, and on feast days. The cultural significance of the garment should not be underestimated, both as an expression of local and national identity and a passing on and reinforcing of traditional skills that bind local communities together.

A young Faroese person is normally handed down a set of children's Faroese clothes that have passed from generation to generation. Children are confirmed at age 14, and normally start to collect the pieces to make an adult outfit, which is considered as a rite of passage. Traditionally the aim would have been to complete the outfit by the time a young person was ready to marry and wear the clothes at the ceremony—though it is mainly only men who do this now.

Each piece is intricately hand-knitted, dyed, woven or embroidered to the specifications of the wearer. For example, the man's waistcoat is put together by hand in bright blue, red or black fine wool. The front is then intricately embroidered with colourful silk threads, often by a female relative. The motifs are often local Faroese flowers or herbs. After this, a row of Faroese-made solid silver buttons are sewn on the outfit.

Women wear embroidered silk, cotton or wool shawls and pinafores that can take months to weave or embroider with local flora and fauna. They are also adorned with a handwoven black and red ankle-length skirt, knitted black and red jumper, a velvet belt, and black 18th century style shoes with silver buckles. The outfit is held together by a row of solid silver buttons, silver chains and locally-made silver brooches and belt buckles, often fashioned with Viking style motifs.

Both men's and women's national dress are extremely costly and can take many years to assemble. Women in the family often work together to assemble the outfits, including knitting the close-fitting jumpers, weaving and embroidering, sewing and assembling the national dress.

This tradition binds together families, passes on traditional crafts, and reinforces the Faroese culture of traditional village life in the context of a modern society.

Archives 
The National Archives of the Faroe Islands (Faroese: Tjóðskjalasavnið) is located in Tórshavn. Their main task is to collect, organize, record and preserve the archival records (documents) of the authorities, in order to make them available to the public in the future. In this context, the National Archives supervises the register (diary) and archives of the public authorities. Currently, there are no other permanent archives in the Faroe Islands, but since the end of 2017, the national government has provided financial support for a three-year pilot project under the name "Tvøroyrar Skjalasavn", which aims to collect private archives from the area.

Libraries 
The National Library of the Faroe Islands (in Faroese: Føroya Landsbókasavn) is based in Tórshavn and its main task is to collect, record, preserve and disseminate knowledge of literature related to the Faroe Islands. The National Library also functions as a research library and public library. In addition to the National Library, there are 15 municipal libraries and 11 school libraries in the Faroe Islands.

Museums and galleries 
The Faroe Islands has numerous museums and galleries.

Føroya Fornminnissavn, Historical Museum; Listasavn Førøya, Faroese Museum of Art; Náttúrugripasavnið, Faroese Museum of Natural History; Norðurlandahúsið, House of the North; Heima á Garði, Hoyvík, Open Air Museum in Hoyvík; Føroya Sjósavn, Faroese Aquarium in Argir; Galerie Focus, Glarsmiðjan; Listagluggin, Art Gallery.

Visual arts 

Faroese visual art is of great importance for the memory of Faroese national identity, as well as for the dissemination of the Faroese visual universe.

The different periods and expressions of the visual arts meet and complement each other, but can also create a tension between the past and the present form of expression.

Faroese stamps designed by Faroese artists are currently on offer.

The first Faroese art exhibition was held in Tórshavn in 1927.

Artists visiting the Faroe Islands 

In 1890, the German painter Alf Bachmann visited the Faroe Islands.

In 1995, the German artist Ingo Kühl painted watercolours in Gjógv, after which the nine-part Faroe Islands picture cycle was created, which was exhibited in the Royal Danish Embassy in Berlin in 2003/2004.

Cinema 
Faroese filmmakers have made several short films in particular in recent decades, and Katrin Ottarsdóttir, among others, has directed three feature films, several shorts and documentaries since her debut in 1989 with Rhapsody of the Atlantic. In 2012, the Faroese Geytin Film Award was established. These are two film awards that are presented once a year at a film festival at the Nordic House in Tórshavn in December. Filmmakers enter their films and a committee selects up to 10 films, which are screened at the event at the Nordic House. The main prize, worth DKK 25,000 and a statuette, is called Geytin and is awarded by the Nordic House, while the second prize, the Audience Award (Áskoðaravirðislønin), is worth DKK 15,000 and is awarded by the Thorshavn City Council. Sakaris Stórá won the first Geytin in December 2012 with the film Summarnátt (Summer Night).

In February 2014, his film Vetrarmorgun (Winter Morning) won three awards at the Berlinale. In 2012, Annika á Lofti won the Audience Award.In 2013, Olaf Johannessen won a Robert for Best Supporting Actor in the TV series Forbrydelsen III. In 2013 Dávur Djurhuus Geytin won for the short film Terminal, while Jónfinn Stenberg won the Audience Award for the short film Munch. In 2014, the same person won both film awards, as Heiðrikur á Heygum won both the Geytin and the Audience Award for the 30-minute horror film Skuld (Guilt) Andrias Høgenni won both awards at the Geytin in 2016 for the short film A Crack.

In 2019, he won the top prize at Geytin for the short film Ikki illa meint. The same film, which was his graduation film in Super 16, was awarded at the Cannes Film Festival, Semaine de la Critique, and also won Danish film awards such as the Robert for Best Short Film and the fiction award at the Ekko Shortlist Awards.

In 2014, the Faroese Ministry of Culture received a grant in the Finance Act to provide financial support for Faroese films. In 2017, Filmshúsið was established. Filmshúsið is located in Sjóvinnuhúsið in Tórshavn. They will guide and assist the Faroese film community and market Faroese films abroad and assist film productions. The Klippfisk film workshop is also located in Sjóvinnuhúsið. Klippfisk is supported by the municipality of Tórshavn and works with young film talent, including organizing the annual Nóllywood film school for teenagers. Nóllywood is held on the island of Nólsoy, usually during the summer vacations.

Public holidays

Ólavsøka is on 29 July; it commemorates the death of Saint Olaf. The celebrations are held in Tórshavn, starting on the evening of the 28th and continuing until the 31st. 28 July is a half working day for the members of some of the labour unions, while Ólavsøkudagur (St Olaf's Day) on 29 July is a full holiday for most but not all union members.

The official celebration starts on the 29th, with the opening of the Faroese Parliament, a custom that dates back 900 years. This begins with a service held in Tórshavn Cathedral; all members of parliament as well as civil and church officials walk to the cathedral in a procession. All of the parish ministers take turns giving the sermon. After the service, the procession returns to the parliament for the opening ceremony.

Other celebrations are marked by different kinds of sports competitions, the rowing competition (in Tórshavn Harbour) being the most popular, art exhibitions, pop concerts, and the famous Faroese dance in Sjónleikarhúsið and on Vaglið outdoor singing on 29 July (continuing after midnight on 30 July). The celebrations have many facets, and only a few are mentioned here.

Many people also mark the occasion by wearing the national Faroese dress.

 New Year's Day, 1 January.
 Maundy Thursday
 Good Friday
 Easter Sunday
 Easter Monday
 Flag day, 25 April.
 General/Great Prayer Day (Dýri biðidagur), 4th Friday after Easter.
 Ascension Day
 Whit Sunday
 Whit Monday
 Constitution Day, 5 June (half-day holiday).
 St. Olav's Eve, 28 July (half-day holiday for some workers' unions).
 St. Olav's Day, 29 July (full holiday for some workers' unions).
 Christmas Eve, 24 December.
 Christmas Day, 25 December.
 Boxing Day, 26 December.
 New Year's Eve, 31 December (half-day holiday).

See also

 Outline of the Faroe Islands
 Faroese Dane
 Faroese language conflict
 Gøtudanskt accent
 
 Faroe–Soviet Friendship Association
 The Unity of the Realm
 Greenland

Other similar territories 
 Åland (Finland)
 Svalbard (Norway)

References

Notes

Citations

Further reading

 Ecott, Tim 'The Land of Maybe: A Faroe Islands Year' (Short Books, UK 2020)
 Gaffin, Dennis (1996). 'In Place: Spatial and Social Order in a Faeroe Islands Community' (Prospect Heights, IL: Waveland Press)
 
 Miller, James. The North Atlantic Front: Orkney, Shetland, Faroe and Iceland at War (2004)
 
 James Proctor, Faroe Islands. Bradt Travel Guides, 2019.

External links

 The Government of the Faroe Islands website
 The Home Rule Act of the Faroe Islands
 Archive of The Unity of the Realm (status of the Faroe Islands within the Kingdom of Denmark)

 
Christian states
Danish dependencies
Faroe
Extinct volcanoes
Former Norwegian colonies
Island countries
Faroe Islands
Kingdom of Norway (872–1397)
Members of the Nordic Council
Northwestern European countries
Paleogene volcanism
Regions of Europe with multiple official languages
States and territories established in 1948
Volcanoes of Denmark
Danish-speaking countries and territories